Sir Tennant Sloan, KCIE, CSI (9 November 1884 – 15 October 1972) was a British colonial administrator in India and Scotland international rugby union player.

Biography 
Educated at the Glasgow Academy, Glasgow University, and Christ Church, Oxford, Sloan joined the Indian Civil Service, retiring as adviser to the Governor of the United Provinces in 1945. He was appointed CIE in 1930, CSI in 1936, and knighted KCIE in 1942.

Rugby Union career

Amateur career

Sloan played for Glasgow Academicals.

Provincial career

He was capped by Glasgow District in 1906.

International career

Sloan was capped for Scotland in 1905.

References

1884 births
1972 deaths
Rugby union players from Glasgow
Scottish rugby union players
Scotland international rugby union players
Glasgow Academicals rugby union players
Glasgow District (rugby union) players
Rugby union centres
Indian Civil Service (British India) officers
Knights Commander of the Order of the Indian Empire
Companions of the Order of the Star of India
People educated at the Glasgow Academy
Alumni of the University of Glasgow
Alumni of Christ Church, Oxford